Georgia Southern Eagles basketball may refer to either of the basketball teams that represent Georgia Southern University:
Georgia Southern Eagles men's basketball
Georgia Southern Eagles women's basketball